The NWA Tennessee Tag Team Championship is a title controlled by, and defended in NWA Smoky Mountain Wrestling.

Title history

Reigns

See also
List of National Wrestling Alliance championships

References
Official NWA Tennessee Tag Team Championship History

National Wrestling Alliance state wrestling championships
National Wrestling Alliance championships
Tag team wrestling championships
Professional wrestling in Tennessee